Keith DeWayne Lee (born December 28, 1962) is an American former professional basketball player who was selected by the Chicago Bulls in the first round (11th pick overall) of the 1985 NBA draft later to be traded to the Cleveland Cavaliers. A 6′10″ forward-center from Memphis State University, Lee played in three NBA seasons for the Cleveland Cavaliers and New Jersey Nets.

High school and college
Keith Lee played high school basketball at West Memphis High School in West Memphis, Arkansas. The 1979-1980 team is considered by many to be the top high school basketball team in Arkansas history, going undefeated for a 30-0 record.  After losing future NBA player Michael Cage to graduation, the 1980-1981 team went undefeated as well and set the longest winning streak for high school basketball in the state at 60 consecutive wins.

One of the most renowned players in Tiger basketball history, Keith Lee came to the University of Memphis in 1981–82 and made an immediate impact on the program.

During his four-year career, Memphis State compiled a record of 104–24, and made three NCAA tournament appearances (including one trip to the Final Four). Lee also guided the team to three Metro Conference titles, a school record 31 wins in 1984-85 and helped land the Tigers in the final Associated Press Top 20 poll all four seasons.

The four-time Associated Press All-American was Metro Conference Player of the Year in 1982 and 1985 and was named to 29 All-American teams. He is the Tigers all-time leading scorer with 2,408 points (18.8) and all-time leading rebounder with 1,336 (10.4). Lee has the high honor of being the first ever four-time All American.

Lee was drafted by the Chicago Bulls in 1985.

In 1985 Keith Lee helped lead the Memphis State Tigers to the Final Four and was also a first team All American. He was the first Tiger to earn AP All-America honors four times (first-team as a senior). Lee helped the Tigers compile a 104-24 (.813) record with four NCAA appearances from 1981 to 1985. His 2,408 career points are a Tiger record, and his number was retired in 1985.

Professional
Lee's best year as a professional came during his rookie season for the Cavs when he appeared in 58 games and averaged 7.4 ppg. In his NBA career, Lee played in 182 games and scored a total of 1,114 points.

Lee received a degree in interdisciplinary studies from the University of Memphis in December, 2008 and is a head basketball coach at a Shelby County Schools high school.

See also 
 List of NCAA Division I men's basketball players with 2000 points and 1000 rebounds

References

External links 
 Career stats

1962 births
Living people
20th-century African-American sportspeople
21st-century African-American people
African-American basketball players
All-American college men's basketball players
American expatriate basketball people in Argentina
American men's basketball players
Basketball players from Arkansas
Centers (basketball)
Chicago Bulls draft picks
Cleveland Cavaliers players
Memphis Tigers men's basketball players
New Jersey Nets players
Orlando Magic expansion draft picks
People from West Memphis, Arkansas
Power forwards (basketball)
Rapid City Thrillers players
United States Basketball League players